The 1980 United States House of Representatives election in Vermont was held on November 4, 1980. Republican nominee Jim Jeffords defeated Citizens Party (United States) candidate Robin Lloyd and Liberty Union Party nominee Peter Diamondstone.

Republican primary

Liberty Union primary

General election

References

1980
Vermont
1980 Vermont elections